Taste of Love is a 2014 Nigerian telenovela, created by Globacom and aired on Africa Magic and STV. On release, it was reported to be the first Nigerian telenova. The complete season featured 150 episodes that began airing in October 2014.

Synopsis 
The series is centered on the interrelationships between the families of Musa-Phillips, Pepples and Rhodes.

Cast 
Blossom Chukwujekwu as Kelechi Pepple
Makida Moka as Hadiza Musa-Philips
Ini Dima-Okojie
Lilian Esoro 
Gabriel Afolayan
Deyemi Okanlawon

Reception 
For their roles as "Hadiza" and "Kelechi", Makida Moka and Blossom received "television actress of the year" and "television actor of the year" nominations at the 2015 Nigerian Broadcasters Merit Awards. The series was also nominated for TV series of the year category, but lost to Super Story.

References 

2014 Nigerian television series debuts
Films shot in Ibadan
Films shot in Lagos
Africa Magic original programming